The Zee Cine Award Best Story is a technical award.

Winners 

Bollywood
 Cinema of India

External links
Winners of the 2007 Zee Cine Awards

Zee Cine Awards